The Little Belt Mountains are a section of the Rocky Mountains in the U.S. state of Montana. Situated mainly in the Lewis and Clark National Forest, the mountains are used for logging and recreation for the residents of Great Falls, Montana. Showdown is a ski area located within the mountains located off US Highway 89 which splits the mountains in half connecting White Sulphur Springs and Belt, MT.

The Little Belts have been mined for silver since the 1880s, and for sapphire since 1896.

The mountains are named for a butte in the range, Belt Butte, itself named for a band of white rock which encircles it.

The Showdown Ski Area holds the state's record for snowfall,  of snow in one winter.

The mountain range of gently rolling peaks and expansive conifer forests contains two large roadless areas. This area includes the Middle and Lost Forks of the Judith River, which cut deep canyons through multicolored limestone cliffs. The Middle Fork-Judith WSA contains over 29 miles of streams containing Yellowstone cutthroat and rainbow trout. Higher elevations are covered in lodgepole pine and whitebark pine, while lower elevations contain ponderosa pine and douglas fir intermixed with grassy parks and meadows. The Smith River Canyon, a popular float trip, is along the western edge of this area.

Ponderosa pine and douglas-fir are the predominant tree species in the Little Belts, and wildlife includes black bear, elk, and white-tailed and mule deer.

See also
 List of mountain ranges in Montana

Notes

External links
 Geology of Little Belt Mountains

Mountain ranges of Montana
Ranges of the Rocky Mountains
Geology of Montana
Landforms of Meagher County, Montana
Lewis and Clark National Forest